Thurlstone is a village near Penistone in the metropolitan borough of Barnsley in South Yorkshire, England. Originally it was a small farming community. Some industries developed using water power from the River Don such as corn milling, wire drawing and various wool and cloth processes. Most of these are now gone and only James Durrans (carbon products) and Service Direct owned by 'Don Eddie' remain. The village is now a dormitory for the urban areas of South and West Yorkshire. The village now falls in the Penistone West ward of the Barnsley MBC.

Its name is believed to be of Old English origin, possibly referring to the god Thunor. Other sources argue that its name is taken from thirled (pierced) rock which is found at its location. The nearby village Thurgoland may have a similar derivation.

The parish church is the Church of St Saviour.

Notable people
 Nicholas Saunderson - A prominent member of the scientific community in the 18th century was born in the village.
John Stones - England international professional footballer, "The Barnsley Beckenbauer" hails from the village.

Images

See also
Listed buildings in Penistone

References

External links

 Thurlstone Primary School

Geography of the Metropolitan Borough of Barnsley
Villages in South Yorkshire
Towns and villages of the Peak District